The 2018 Judo Grand Slam was held in Abu Dhabi, United Arab Emirates, from 27 to 29 October 2018.

Medal summary

Men's events

Women's events

Source Results

Medal table

References

External links
 

2018 IJF World Tour
2018 Judo Grand Slam
Judo
Grand Slam Abu Dhabi 2018
Judo
Judo